Chuck Renslow (August 26, 1929 – June 29, 2017) was an  American businessperson, known for pioneering homoerotic photography in the mid-20th-century US, and establishing many landmarks of late-20th-century gay male culture, especially in the Chicago area. His accomplishments included the cofounding with Tony DeBlase of the Leather Archives and Museum, the cofounding with Dom Orejudos of the Gold Coast bar, Man's Country Baths, and the International Mr. Leather competition, and the founding by himself alone of Chicago's August White Party, and the magazines Triumph, Rawhide, and Mars. He was the romantic partner of Dom Orejudos (who was an erotica artist better known by his pen names Etienne and Stephen) and later Ron Ehemann.

Career 
Renslow was a photographer, and in 1952 met Dom Orejudos on Chicago's Oak Street Beach, asking him to model for him. They founded Kris Studios, a physique photography studio that took photos for gay magazines they published. The studio was named in part to honor transgender pioneer Christine Jorgensen. In 1958, they bought a gym which they renamed Triumph Gymnasium and Health Studio. That same year Renslow and Orejudos bought Gold Coast Show Lounge, and transformed it into the country's first gay leather bar, called the Gold Coast bar, with a uniform/western/leather dress code, a backroom, and homoerotic art (by Orejudos) on the walls. In 1965, Renslow helped found the Second City Motorcycle Club. Renslow founded Chicago's August White Party on August 8, 1974, when he hosted a party to celebrate his birthday and thank his patrons. It was then held for the next 36 years until 2010. The largest party was held in 1979 at Navy Pier with 5,000 participants. 
The forerunner of the International Mr. Leather competition was the 1970s "Mr. Gold Coast" bar contest held at the Gold Coast bar owned by Renslow and Orejudos. The "Mr. Gold Coast" contest became one of the bar's most popular promotions causing the need to locate the competition to a larger venue (in 1979), upon which the title was changed to International Mr. Leather. In 1991 Renslow and Tony DeBlase founded the Leather Archives and Museum “as a community archives, library, and museum of Leather, kink, fetish, and BDSM history and culture.”

Honors and legacy 
In 1990, Renslow received the Steve Maidhof Award for National or International Work from the National Leather Association International.

In 1991, Renslow was inducted into the Chicago LGBT Hall of Fame.

In 1992, he received the President's Award as part of the Pantheon of Leather Awards.

In 1993, he received the Lifetime Achievement Award as part of the Pantheon of Leather Awards.

In 1995, “Chuck Renslow – IML” was one of the recipients of the International Deaf Leather Recognition Award.

In 1996, he and Jim McGlade received the Lifetime Achievement Award as part of the Pantheon of Leather Awards, and in 2007 Renslow received it alone.

In 1998, he received the Forebear Award as part of the Pantheon of Leather Awards.

In 2009, he was inducted into the Leather Hall of Fame.

In June 2019, Renslow was one of the inaugural fifty American “pioneers, trailblazers, and heroes” inducted on the National LGBTQ Wall of Honor within the Stonewall National Monument (SNM) in New York City’s Stonewall Inn. The SNM is the first U.S. national monument dedicated to LGBTQ rights and history, and the wall's unveiling was timed to take place during the 50th anniversary of the Stonewall riots.

Renslow is listed as the Chairman In Memoriam of the Leather Archives and Museum. The museum also gives out the Chuck Renslow President's Award to honor individuals and organizations for their contributions to it.

Further reading
Baim, Tracy; Keehnen, Owen (2011). Leatherman: The Legend of Chuck Renslow. CreateSpace. .

References

External links 
 Chuck Renslow Dance Photographs at the Newberry Library

1929 births
2017 deaths
Physique photography
Businesspeople from Chicago
American LGBT businesspeople
American gay men
Leather subculture
Gay businessmen
20th-century American businesspeople
20th-century American LGBT people
21st-century American LGBT people
Inductees of the Chicago LGBT Hall of Fame